Sergei Aleksandrovich Shudrov (born 11 August 1989) is a Russian former professional footballer.

Club career
He made his professional debut in the Russian Premier League in 2007 for FC Rostov.

References

External links
 

1989 births
People from Neryungrinsky District
Living people
Russian footballers
Association football midfielders
FC Rostov players
Russian Premier League players
FC Rotor Volgograd players
FC SKA-Khabarovsk players
FC SKA Rostov-on-Don players
FC Angusht Nazran players
FC Moscow players
FC Sever Murmansk players
Sportspeople from Sakha